The  was a feudal domain of Japan in the Edo period. Located in what is now the western part of Aichi Prefecture, it encompassed parts of Owari, Mino, and Shinano provinces. Its headquarters were at Nagoya Castle. At its peak, it was rated at 619,500 koku, and was the largest holding of the Tokugawa clan apart from the shogunal lands. The Daimyō of Owari was the Owari Tokugawa family, the first in rank among the gosanke. The domain was also known as

History 
Until the end of the Battle of Sekigahara in September 1600, the area that makes up the Owari Domain was under the control of Fukushima Masanori, head of nearby Kiyosu Castle. After the battle, however, Masanori was transferred to the Hiroshima Domain in Aki Province.

Leaders

Sub-domains
The Owari Domain was supported by the Yanagawa Domain in Mutsu Province and the Takasu Domain in Mino Province.

Yanagawa Domain
The Yanagawa Domain provided 30,000 koku to the Owari Domain annually from 1683 to 1730, when Tokugawa Muneharu came to power and dissolved the domain.

Takasu Domain
The Takasu Domain also provided 30,000 koku to the Owari Domain annually from 1700 to 1870, when it was merged with the Owari Domain.

See also
Han system
List of Han